Florian Schneider-Esleben (7 April 194721 April 2020) was a German musician. He is best known as one of the founding members and leaders of the electronic band Kraftwerk, performing his role with the band until his departure in 2008.

Early life
Schneider was born on 7 April 1947 in the French occupation zone in southern Germany, near the Bodensee, in what would become the state of Baden-Württemberg in 1952. His parents were Paul Schneider-Esleben, an architect, and his wife Evamaria (née van Diemen-Meyerhof). Schneider was Jewish on his mother's side; Paul married the half-Jewish Evamaria in 1946 against the will of his father, who remained a loyal Nazi. Schneider's family moved to Düsseldorf when he was three years old.

Career
Schneider founded Kraftwerk with Ralf Hütter in 1970. They met in 1968 while studying at the Academy of Arts in Remscheid, then at the Robert Schumann Hochschule in Düsseldorf, playing improvisational music together in the ensemble Organisation.  Before meeting Hütter, Schneider had played with Eberhard Kranemann in the group Pissoff from 1967 to 1968. From 1968 to 1969, Schneider played flute, with Hütter on Hammond organ, Kranemann on bass and Paul Lovens on drums.

Originally, Schneider's main instrument was the flute, which he would treat using electronic effects, including tape echo, ring modulation, pitch-to-voltage converters, fuzz and wah-wah, allowing him to use his flute as a bass instrument. He also played violin (similarly treated), electric guitar (including slide guitar), and made use of synthesizers (both as a melodic instrument and as a sound processor). Later, he also created his own electronic flute instrument. After the release of Kraftwerk's 1974 album, Autobahn, his use of acoustic instruments diminished.

Schneider, speaking in 1991, said: "I had studied seriously up to a certain level, then I found it boring; I looked for other things, I found that the flute was too limiting... Soon I bought a microphone, then loudspeakers, then an echo, then a synthesizer. Much later I threw the flute away; it was a sort of process." Although he had limited keyboard technique, he apparently preferred to trigger the synth sounds through a keyboard (later, developments in sequencing limited the need for hands-on playing).

Schneider's approach was concentrated on sound design (in an interview in 2005, Hütter called him a "sound fetishist") and vocoding/speech-synthesis. One patented implementation of the latter was christened the Robovox, a distinctive feature of the Kraftwerk sound. Hütter said of Schneider's approach:

Schneider was also known for his comical, enigmatic interviews, although he only seldom gave permission to be interviewed.

In 2015, Schneider and Dan Lacksman, with the help of Uwe Schmidt, released an electronic ode, "Stop Plastic Pollution", for ocean environment conservation as part of the Parley for the Oceans campaign.

Departure from Kraftwerk
Schneider did not perform on any of the dates of the Kraftwerk 2008 world tour, with his last performance with the band being in November 2006 in Spain. His position onstage was subsequently filled by Stefan Pfaffe, an associate working for the band as a video technician. According to a close associate of the group, Schneider left Kraftwerk in November 2008. On 6 January 2009, NME confirmed Schneider's departure.

Reputedly, Schneider's departure followed a dispute with Hütter over a bicycle pump, a rumour which some sources describe as unfounded.

Death
Schneider died from cancer on 21 April 2020, fourteen days after his 73rd birthday, having suffered from the illness for a short time.

Legacy
David Bowie titled his "Heroes" instrumental track "V-2 Schneider" after Schneider, and was heavily influenced by Kraftwerk's sound during his "Berlin period" in the late 1970s.

Shortly after Schneider's death, the bells of the St. Martin's Cathedral, Utrecht rang out with the tones of the song "Das Model".

On 12 May 2021, Kraftwerk was announced as one of the inductees of the Rock and Roll Hall of Fame.

Notes

References

External links

 
 
 
 

1947 births
2020 deaths
20th-century German male musicians
21st-century German male musicians
Deaths from cancer in Germany
German electronic musicians
German flautists
German people of Jewish descent
Kraftwerk members
Musicians from Düsseldorf
Robert Schumann Hochschule alumni
20th-century flautists
21st-century flautists